Réjean Genest (born March 9, 1946) is a Canadian politician, who was elected to the House of Commons of Canada in the 2011 election. He represented the electoral district of Shefford as a member of the New Democratic Party.

He was formerly a meteorologist. At the time of his election, he was a horticulturalist and editor of Les Beaux Jardins online magazine.

Genest did not stand for re-election in 2015.

It was reported in 2018 that Genest was recruited by the Green Party to be its candidate for Shefford in the 2019 election. He dismissed the rumors as untrue.

Electoral record

References

External links
Official website
Profile on parliament website

1946 births
French Quebecers
Living people
Members of the House of Commons of Canada from Quebec
New Democratic Party MPs
People from Capitale-Nationale
People from Granby, Quebec
21st-century Canadian politicians